Bruce Seth Green is an American television director. 

Green's credits include Knight Rider, Hercules: The Legendary Journeys, Babylon 5, Buffy the Vampire Slayer, Angel, Dawson’s Creek, Gilmore Girls, Law & Order, Diagnosis Murder, Baywatch, and Highlander.

His last directorial credit was an episode of Roswell in 2001.

Green is not related to Buffy actor Seth Green; on occasion, some sources confuse them.

References

External links

American television directors
Living people
Place of birth missing (living people)
Year of birth missing (living people)